In mathematics, the quadruple product is a product of four vectors in three-dimensional Euclidean space. The name "quadruple product" is used for two different products, the scalar-valued scalar quadruple product and the vector-valued vector quadruple product or vector product of four vectors.

Scalar quadruple product 
The scalar quadruple product  is defined as the dot product of two cross products:

where a, b, c, d are vectors in three-dimensional Euclidean space. It can be evaluated using the identity:

or using the determinant:

Proof

We first prove that 

, where

It then follows from the properties of skew-symmetric matrices that

We also know from vector triple products that 

Using this identity along with the one we have just derived, we obtain the desired identity:

Vector quadruple product 
The vector quadruple product  is defined as the cross product of two cross products:

where a, b, c, d are vectors in three-dimensional Euclidean space. It can be evaluated using the identity:

using the notation for the triple product: 

Equivalent forms can be obtained using the identity:

This identity can also be written using tensor notation and the Einstein summation convention as follows:

Application
The quadruple products are useful for deriving various formulas in spherical and plane geometry. For example, if four points are chosen on the unit sphere, A, B, C, D, and unit vectors drawn from the center of the sphere to the four points, a, b, c, d respectively, the identity:

in conjunction with the relation for the magnitude of the cross product:

and the dot product:

where a = b = 1 for the unit sphere, results in the identity among the angles attributed to Gauss:

where x is the angle between a × b and c × d, or equivalently, between the planes defined by these vectors.

Josiah Willard Gibbs's pioneering work on vector calculus provides several other examples.

See also 
Binet–Cauchy identity
Lagrange's identity

Notes

References

Operations on vectors
Vector calculus